Cruz Azul is a football club based in Mexico City, that competes in Liga MX.

The club has won the first division title nine times, the Copa MX three times, the Campeón de Campeones twice, the Segunda División de México once, the CONCACAF Cup six times, and was runner up in the Copa Libertadores and Copa Interamericana once.

Key

Key to league:
 Pos. = Final position
 Pl. = Played
 W = Games won
 D = Games drawn
 L = Games lost
 GF = Goals scored
 GA = Goals against
 Pts = Points

Key to rounds:
 C = Champion
 F = Final (Runner-up)
 SF = Semi-finals
 QF = Quarter-finals
 R16/R32 = Round of 16, round of 32, etc.
 PO = Playoff round for liguilla
 GS = Group stage
 W/O = Withdrawn from competition

Top scorers shown in italics with number of goals scored in bold  are players who were also top scorers in the Primera División de México/Liga MX that season.

Seasons